Murage was a medieval toll for the building or repair of town walls in England, Wales and Ireland.

Origin
The term murage, while having this specific meaning, could also refer to other aid for walls or to the walls themselves. It is generally applied to defensive town walls, but can also refer to flood defences and sea walls. The tax was taken in many towns in Ireland and in English possessions in France.

This was granted by the king by letters patent for a limited term, but the walls were frequently not completed within the term, so the grant was periodically renewed. Such grants sometimes specifically state that they were to be taken for the repair and maintenance of walls. In the later Middle Ages, many places had a vested collection of murage.

The earliest grant was for Shrewsbury in 1218. (Actually, the grant is dated 26 June 1220.) Other towns receiving early grants included Bridgnorth, Stafford, Worcester, Oxford, Gloucester, and Bristol. Many of these places were in the west of England, and were particularly at risk from Welsh incursions.

Since the king's writ did not run in Wales, it is perhaps surprising that several Welsh towns also obtained murage grants. The first was for Hay on Wye in 1232, the year after the town was burnt by Llywelyn the Great. Other towns in Wales or the Welsh Marches having such grants included Oswestry, Radnor, Abergavenny, Carmarthen, Monmouth, Knighton, Montgomery, and Clun. Clun is now fully in England and Knighton partly so. However few such grants were made after 1283, after the completion of the Edward I's Conquest of Wales. A possible reason why the king's writ applied in the context of trade in Wales was that many merchants would be based in England and elsewhere and Welsh towns would need to show royal consent to tax powerful English of foreign merchants.

Some of the walls were probably enclosing towns for the first time. Others, such as at Worcester, were extensions to walls in order to bring suburbs inside the town, or to fund the repair of existing walls, as was the case at Canterbury, to which murage was granted in 1378, 1379, 1385, 1399 and 1402.

In the Lordship of Ireland, murage was used to build walls around Dublin (1221), Galway (1270), Trim (1289–90), Fethard (1292), Castledermot (1275), Kilkenny, Drogheda, Youghal, Dundalk, Naas and many other places; as much of Ireland was not under royal control, cities loyal to the King needed walls to protect them from Gaelic Irish raiders. In Dublin there was a major scandal over murage in 1311-12, when it emerged that none of the funds collected for  murage had actually been spent on repairs to the city walls.

"Ye Olde Murenger House", a public house in High Street, Newport, South Wales, dated to about 1530, takes its name from the collector of this toll.

References

Other sources

City walls in the United Kingdom
Medieval defences
Medieval Wales
Taxation in medieval England